The  St. Louis Gateway Film Critics Association Award for Best Actor is one of the annual awards given by the St. Louis Gateway Film Critics Association.

Winners

2000s

2010s

2020s
 

Actor
Film awards for lead actor